Air Vice Marshal Charles William Nutting,  (15 April 1889 – 25 February 1964) was a wireless officer in the Royal Naval Air Service during the First World War, a Royal Air Force signals specialist during the inter-war years and the RAF's Director / Director-General of Signals during the first half of the Second World War. He retired from the RAF in 1942 and spent the remainder of the war as the Telecommunications Adviser to the British minister in the Middle East.

Honours and awards
22 June 1916 – Lieutenant Charles William Nutting RNVR, Lieutenant Edward Raymond Peal, RNVR and Sub-Lieutenant Horace William Furnival, RNR are each awarded the Distinguished Service Cross:

11 July 1940 – Air Commodore Charles William Nutting OBE, DSC, Royal Air Force is promoted to a Commander of the Order of the British Empire.

References

1889 births
1964 deaths
Commanders of the Order of the British Empire
Recipients of the Distinguished Service Cross (United Kingdom)
Royal Air Force air marshals of World War II
Royal Naval Air Service aviators
Royal Naval Air Service personnel of World War I